Andrew Frank may refer to:

 Andrew A. Frank, American professor of mechanical and aeronautical engineering
 Andrew K. Frank (born 1970), American professor of history
 Andrew U. Frank (born 1948), Swiss-Austrian professor for geoinformation
 Andrew Frank (composer) (1946–2022), American composer